The Treason Act 1543 (35 Hen 8 c 2) was an Act of the Parliament of England passed during the reign of King Henry VIII of England, which stated that acts of treason or misprision of treason that were committed outside the realm of England could be tried within England. Those convicted of high treason would have their estates confiscated by the King and then be hanged, drawn and quartered.

This Act received renewed attention in 1769, following protests against the Townshend Acts in colonial Boston. After determining that the 1543 Treason Act was still in effect, Parliament instructed Governor Francis Bernard of Massachusetts to gather evidence against Bostonians who might have committed acts of treason, so that they could be transported to England for trial. Colonial assemblies in British America passed resolutions against such an action, arguing that it would violate their constitutional right to a trial by jury of their peers.

No one in Massachusetts was arrested under the terms of the Treason Act, but the matter came up again in Rhode Island after the Gaspée Affair in 1772. Once again, officials were unable to obtain reliable evidence of treason.

The Act was repealed on 1 January 1968 by section 10(2) of, and Part I of Schedule 3 to, the Criminal Law Act 1967.

Other treason statutes passed in 1543
The Act should not be confused with two other Acts, 35 Hen. 8 c. 1 and 3, which were also about treason and were passed in the same year. The first made it treason to refuse to take an oath against the Pope. The second made it treason to attempt to deprive the King of his royal title or of his title as Defender of the Faith and as Supreme Head of the Church in England and Ireland. Both forms of treason were abolished in 1547, but the latter was revived in the first year of the reign of Elizabeth I.

See also
High treason in the United Kingdom
Treason Act

References
Knollenberg, Bernhard. Growth of the American Revolution, 1766–1775. New York: Free Press, 1975. .
Jensen, Merrill. The Founding of a Nation: A History of the American Revolution, 1763–1776. New York: Oxford University Press, 1968.

External links
Full text of Act

1543 in law
1543 in England
Acts of the Parliament of England (1485–1603)
Treason in England